The East Gibson School Corporation is the smallest of the three public school governing institutions in Gibson County in both land area and student body with just over 1,000 students. The EGSC is responsible for a district including three townships of easternmost Gibson County; Barton, Center, and Columbia. Waldo J. Wood Memorial Jr/Sr High School, Barton Township School, Francisco Elementary School, and Oakland City Elementary School make up the facilities of the district. Buckskin, Francisco, Mackey, Oakland City, and Somerville are the towns served by the East Gibson School Corporation. Waldo J. Wood Memorial Jr/Sr High School is the smallest of Gibson County's three high schools at 382 students.

Facilities
 Waldo J. Wood Memorial Jr/Sr High School
 Barton Township Elementary School
 Francisco Elementary School
 Oakland City Elementary School

Other Facilities
 Southern Indiana Career & Technical Center

Neighboring School Districts 

 North Gibson School Corporation
 Pike County School Corporation
 South Gibson School Corporation
 Warrick County School Corporation

Resources 
 Southern Indiana Education Center website
 Public School Review - Wood Memorial HS
 School Tree.org - Wood Memorial HS
 Wood Memorial's Indiana Department of Education Profile
 East Gibson School Corporation Website
 East Gibson School Corporation Schools

References 

 

Southwestern Indiana
School districts in Indiana
Education in Gibson County, Indiana